Yevrasovo is a rural locality (a village) in Yagnitskoye Rural Settlement, Cherepovetsky District, Vologda Oblast, Russia. The population was 47 as of 2002.

Geography 
Yevrasovo is located 111 km south of Cherepovets (the district's administrative centre) by road. Shepelevo is the nearest rural locality.

References 

Rural localities in Cherepovetsky District